Azygobothria is a genus of flies in the family Tachinidae.

Species
Azygobothria aurea Townsend, 1911

Distribution
Peru

References

Diptera of South America
Exoristinae
Tachinidae genera
Monotypic Brachycera genera
Taxa named by Charles Henry Tyler Townsend